Villers-sous-Chalamont is a commune in the Doubs department in the Bourgogne-Franche-Comté region in eastern France.

Population

See also
Communes of the Doubs department

References

External links 

 Commune website 

Communes of Doubs